Highway 69 (AR 69, Ark. 69, and Hwy. 69) is a designation for three north–south state highways in northeast Arkansas. A western route of  runs south from Highway 9 at Melbourne to Highway 14/Highway 367 in Newport. A second route of  begins at Highway 163 and runs north through Trumann to Highway 158 at Lunsford. A third route begins at U.S. Route 49/Highway 1 (US 49/AR 1) at the city limits of Paragould and runs north to terminate at US 412B in the city.

Route description

Melbourne to Newport
AR 69 begins at AR 367 in Newport and heads north to Jacksonport. A Spur Route 69 develops in Jacksonport. The route leads northwest to AR 122 in Newark and AR 233 in Sulphur Rock. Continuing north, the route passes through Cushman and Mount Pleasant.

Shady Grove to Lunsford
Arkansas Highway 69 begins in Poinsett County and heads east from AR 163. It crosses Interstate 555 (I-555) as Exit 29 continuing east to Trumann. After detaching a spur route that leads through Trumann, AR 69 leads mostly north and ends at AR 158.

Paragould segment
AR 69 runs from US 49/AR 1 south of Paragould. The route runs east then north to terminate at US 412B/AR 135 in downtown Paragould.

Major intersections

Auxiliary routes

Highway 69 has three business routes and four spur routes. As cities have grown, bypasses have become necessary, and the former downtown alignments of AR 69 have become the business routes discussed here.

See also

 List of state highways in Arkansas

Notes

References

External links

069
Transportation in Jackson County, Arkansas
Transportation in Independence County, Arkansas
Transportation in Izard County, Arkansas
Transportation in Poinsett County, Arkansas
Transportation in Craighead County, Arkansas
Transportation in Greene County, Arkansas